The North Atlantic codling (Lepidion eques) is a species of fish in the family Moridae.

Name
The specific name eques means "knight", referring to the plume-like protuberance on its head; this is also reflected in the Icelandic name bláriddari and Danish name blå ridder, both meaning "blue knight."

Description

The North Atlantic codling is pink-brown in colour with a blue tinge; albinos are common. Its posterior nostril is immediately anterior to the eye. There are 55–60 dorsal finrays and 50–54 anal finrays. It has a lateral line with pit organs but no pores, and 8–13 pyloric caeca.

Habitat

Behaviour
The North Atlantic codling feeds on crustaceans and polychaetes.
It usually swims close to sandy bottoms and exhibits station holding behavior.

References

Moridae
Fish described in 1887
Taxa named by Albert Günther